Soli or Soloi is an ancient Greek city on the island of Cyprus, located next to the town of Karavostasi, southwest of Morphou (Guzelyurt), and on the coast in the gulf of Morphou. Since 1974 the site has been within the territory of the Turkish Republic of Northern Cyprus.

Originally, Soloi was located in a much constricted geographical location. At its current location, the whole urban centre was designed by Solon during his 10-year trip, after whom the name Soloi is commonly attributed.  Reyes, however, disputes this etymological origin, as the name Soloi appears on the Esarhaddon prism predating Solon's visit. Soloi was one of the ten city-kingdoms into which Cyprus was divided at the time.

What remains today is mainly from the Roman period, most notably the mosaic floor of the basilica with its wealth of birds, animals and geometric designs and a picture of a swan.  There is a theatre but it has been renovated to the point that it no longer has any atmosphere of its original age.

A trio of ancient underground tombs has been discovered near Soli. The tombs were excavated in 2005 and 2006. Two of the tombs contained many findings, but the third tomb was empty as a result of looting. According to archaeologists the findings indicate a high level of wealth and power. Some of the vessels found are similar to items typically produced in Athens. The artifacts are on display at the Museum of Archeology and Nature in Morphou.

According to ancient written sources the city was supplying Athens with timber and copper and in return getting luxurious metal vessels from there.

Famous people from Soli
 Nicocles, son of Pasicrates, who accompanied Alexander to India (Arrian, Indica 18.8).
 Stasanor, 4th century BC general of Alexander the Great and later governor of Drangiana, Bactria and Sogdiana, following the partition of Triparadisus (Arrian, Successors 35).
 Stasander, 4th century BC general of Alexander the Great and later Satrap of Aria and Drangiana
 Hiero of Soli, who was sent by Alexander to circumnavigate the Arabian peninsula, and went as far as the mouth of the Persian Gulf.
 Clearchus of Soli, 4th century BC peripatetician philosopher, thought to have been to Alexandria on the Oxus, in Bactria.

See also
 List of ancient Greek cities
 Solon

References

Cities in ancient Cyprus
Archaeological sites in Northern Cyprus
Former populated places in Cyprus
Archaeological sites in Cyprus